ISAV may refer to:
 Salmon isavirus
 Institut Supérieur Agro-Vétérinaire, now the Faculty of Agronomic and Veterinary Science at Loyola University of Congo

See also 
 Isau (disambiguation)
 Esau, the Biblical figure